Mark Withers (born 3 March 1964) is a former Australian rules footballer who played for Melbourne and the Brisbane Bears in the Victorian Football League (VFL) during the 1980s.

From 1984 to 1986 Withers played with Melbourne and joined Brisbane in 1987 for their inaugural season. He won the Bear's Best and Fairest in 1988 and was their top disposal getter that year.

External links

1964 births
Living people
Melbourne Football Club players
Brisbane Bears players
Brisbane Bears Club Champion winners
North Launceston Football Club players
Australian rules footballers from Tasmania